The 1984–85 Balkans Cup was an edition of the Balkans Cup, a football competition for representative clubs from the Balkan states. It was contested by 8 teams and Iraklis won the trophy.

Quarterfinals

|}

First leg

Second Leg

Ankaragücü won 2–0 on aggregate.

Argeș Pitești won 5–4 on aggregate.

Iraklis won 5–2 on aggregate.

Semifinals

|}

First Leg

Second leg

Argeș Pitești won 4–2 on aggregate.

Iraklis won 4–2 on penalties.

Finals

|}

First leg

Second leg

Iraklis won 5–4 on aggregate.

References

External links
RSSSF Archive → Balkans Cup

Mehmet Çelik. "Balkan Cup". Turkish Soccer

1984
1984–85 in European football
1984–85 in Romanian football
1984–85 in Greek football
1984–85 in Bulgarian football
1984–85 in Turkish football
1984–85 in Albanian football